The United States Secret Service, an agency of the United States Department of Homeland Security, operates a number of field offices in both the United States and in other countries. The following list gives the locations of these offices. For the United States, this article merely lists states and cities that have field offices with links that go not to field offices in states, but to general information on the states and cities.

Field and Resident Offices within the United States, Guam and Puerto Rico

Alabama (3 Offices)
Birmingham, Mobile, Montgomery
Arizona (2 Offices)
Phoenix, Tucson
Arkansas (1 Office)
Little Rock
California (9 Offices)
Camarillo, Fresno, Los Angeles, Riverside, Sacramento, San Diego, San Francisco, San Jose, Santa Ana
Colorado (1 Office)
Greenwood Village
Connecticut (1 Office)
New Haven
Delaware (1 Office)
Wilmington
District of Columbia (1 Office) - In addition to the field office in D.C., the Secret Service is headquartered in the city, which is the capital of the United States.
Florida (7 Offices)
Fort Myers, Jacksonville, Miami, Orlando, Tallahassee, Tampa, West Palm Beach
Georgia (3 Offices)
Albany, Atlanta, Savannah
Guam (1 Office)
Hawaii (1 Office)
Honolulu
Illinois (2 Offices)
Chicago, Springfield
Indiana (1 Office)
Indianapolis
Kentucky (2 Offices)
Lexington, Louisville
Louisiana (2 Offices)
Baton Rouge, Metairie
Maine (1 Office)
Portland 
Maryland (2 Offices)
Baltimore, Laurel
Massachusetts (1 Office)
Boston
Michigan (3 Offices)
Detroit, Grand Rapids, Saginaw
Minnesota (1 Office)
Minneapolis
Mississippi (1 Office)
Jackson
Missouri (2 Offices)
Kansas City, St. Louis
Nebraska (1 Office)
Omaha
Nevada (2 Offices)
Las Vegas, Reno
New Hampshire (1 Office)
Manchester
New Jersey (4 Offices)
Egg Harbor Township, Morristown, Newark, Trenton
New Mexico (1 Office)
Albuquerque
New York (7 Offices)
Albany, Brooklyn, Buffalo, Melville, Springfield Gardens, Syracuse, White Plains
North Carolina (4 Offices)
Charlotte, Greensboro, Raleigh, Wilmington
Ohio (5 Offices)
Cincinnati, Columbus, Dayton, Independence, Toledo
Oklahoma (2 Offices)
Oklahoma City, Tulsa
Oregon (1 Office)
Portland
Pennsylvania (3 Offices)
Philadelphia, Pittsburgh, Scranton
Puerto Rico (1 Office)
Guaynabo
Rhode Island (1 Office)
Providence
South Carolina (3 Offices)
Columbia, Greenville, Mount Pleasant
South Dakota (1 Office)
Sioux Falls
Tennessee (4 Offices)
Chattanooga, Knoxville, Memphis, Nashville
Texas (8 Offices)
Austin, El Paso, Houston, Irving, Lubbock, McAllen, San Antonio, Waco
Utah (1 Office)
Salt Lake City
Virginia (3 Offices)
Norfolk, Richmond
Washington (2 Offices)
Seattle, Spokane
West Virginia (1 Office)
Charleston
Wisconsin (1 Office)
Milwaukee
Source:

Offices in foreign countries
The Secret Service maintains field offices at the following foreign countries:
Brazil (1 office, in Brasilia)
Bulgaria (1 office, in Sofia)
Canada (2 offices, in Ottawa and Vancouver)
China (1 office, in Hong Kong)
Colombia (1 office, in Bogota)
Estonia (1 office, in Tallinn)
France (1 office, in Paris)
Germany (1 office, in Frankfurt)
Italy (1 office, in Rome)
Mexico (1 office, in Mexico City)
Netherlands (1 office, at Europol headquarters in The Hague)
Peru (1 office, in Lima)
Romania (1 office, in Bucharest)
South Africa (1 office, in Pretoria)
Spain (1 office, in Madrid)
Thailand (1 office, in Bangkok)
United Kingdom (1 office, in London)

See also 
 List of ATF field divisions
 List of FBI field offices

References

External links
USSS Website's Field Office page, with more exhaustive list of field offices with contact information

Secret Service
Field offices
Buildings of the United States government